Robert Newman (born 1975) is a former English international bowls player.

Bowls career
Newman won three bronze medals in the World Bowls Championship. The first two in the triples and fours at the 2004 World Outdoor Bowls Championship in Ayr followed by another bronze in the fours at the 2008 World Outdoor Bowls Championship in Christchurch.

Newman also won a bronze medal at the lawn bowls competition at the 2010 Commonwealth Games. He announced his retirement in 2016.

He won two Men's National Championships in the triples (2003) and the fours (1993) bowling for Reading.

In 2009 he won the fours silver medal at the Atlantic Bowls Championships and in 2015 he won the triples bronze medal at the Championships. In 2010, he won the Hong Kong International Bowls Classic singles and pairs titles.

References

English male bowls players
Bowls players at the 2010 Commonwealth Games
Commonwealth Games medallists in lawn bowls
Living people
1975 births
Commonwealth Games bronze medallists for England
Medallists at the 2010 Commonwealth Games